John Harold Kroner (November 13, 1908 – April 26, 1968) was a second baseman in Major League Baseball who played from 1935 through 1938 for the Boston Red Sox (1935–36) and Cleveland Indians (1937–38). He was born in St. Louis, Missouri.

In a four-season career, Kroner was a .262 hitter (184-for-702) with seven home runs and 105 RBI in 223 games, including 83 runs, 47 doubles, nine triples, three stolen bases, and a .327 on-base percentage.

Kroner died in his hometown of St. Louis, Missouri, at age 59.

External links

Retrosheet
 

Boston Red Sox players
Cleveland Indians players
Major League Baseball second basemen
Baseball players from St. Louis
1908 births
1968 deaths